Northport Highway, alternately Jalan Pelabuhan Utara, Federal Route 103 or Jalan Parang is an expressway in Port Klang, Selangor, Malaysia. It connects Port Klang in the south to Northport in the north.

The Kilometre Zero of the Federal Route 103 starts at Port Klang.

At most sections, the Federal Route 103 was built under the JKR R5 road standard, allowing maximum speed limit of up to 90 km/h.

History
Construction of the Northport access flyover from Jalan Kurau with trumpet interchange started in 2012 and was completed in early 2014.

Construction of the railway crossing bridge replacing level crossing and extension of the Port Klang flyover started in 2013 and was completed in 2015.

List of interchanges

References

103
Highways in Malaysia